Introducing Payola$ is the four-song EP with which the Payolas made their major label debut on A&M Records.

Track listing 

Side One

 "China Boys" (P. Hyde - Bob Rock)
 "T.N.T." (P. Hyde)

Side Two

 "Rose" (P. Hyde)
 "Jukebox" (P. Hyde - B. Rock)

Personnel 

 Taylor Nelson Little - drums, vocals, organ
 Gary Middleclass - bass, 'mirage saxophone', vocals, organ
 Bob Rock - guitar, vocals, organ
 Paul Hyde - rhythm, vocals, organ

External links
 

1980 debut EPs
Payolas albums
A&M Records EPs